The 1979 Georgia Tech Yellow Jackets football team represented the Georgia Institute of Technology during the 1979 NCAA Division I-A football season. The Yellow Jackets were led by head coach Pepper Rodgers, in his sixth and final year with the team, and played their home games at Grant Field in Atlanta. Rodgers was fired as head coach after a 4–6–1 campaign.

Schedule

Sources:

Roster

References

Georgia Tech
Georgia Tech Yellow Jackets football seasons
Georgia Tech Yellow Jackets football